Gekkenbriefje  (Alternatively: Crazy Going) is a 1981 Dutch film directed by Olga Madsen. It is based upon the book "Zorg dat je een gekkenbriefje krijgt" by Ger Verrips. It was the first movie that Olga Madsen directed.

Cast

 Esgo Heil
 Porgy Franssen 
 Hans Veerman 
 John Smit 
 Marijke Conijn 
 Wim Dröge 
 Paul Gieske 
 Rietje Konings 
 Moniek Kramer 
 Gijs de Lange
 Cor Witschge

External links 
 

Dutch drama films
1981 films
1980s Dutch-language films